Ərəbşahverdi or Arabshakhverdi or Arabsahverdi may refer to:
Ərəbşahverdi, Gobustan, Azerbaijan
Ərəbşahverdi, Goychay, Azerbaijan